Great Moravian Basilica in Bratislava was a Great Moravian church from 9th century at the Bratislava hillfort, in the area of current Bratislava Castle.

Great Moravian basilica 
Great Moravian pre-romanesque basilica in Bratislava was built sometimes in the second half of 9th century. It was built as the part of great moravian hillfort at the place of former Celtic oppidum. It's the largest Great Moravian basilica at the territory of Slovakia, and it was one of the biggest Great Moravian churches. The east end of the church has not been preserved, but on the basis of comparisons with other buildings from this period, it's concluded that it was formed by three apses. Bricks, stone blocks and roofing from an older Roman buildings from the Celtic oppidum were used as a building material. The red paint and part of the painting decoration have been preserved on the plaster remains.

During 10th century, pre-romanesque basilica was probably destroyed. For a short time, tower, which was part of the fortifications was built on the place of basilica.

Romanesque church of St. Saviour 
In the 10th century, early romanesque basilica of Saint Saviour was built on the same place. At the time, Bratislava was the seat of priory. In 1221 it was decided, that the priory with the church should move from the castle area. New church was built under the castle hill, at the place of current St Martin's Cathedral.

A cemetery was discovered around the basilica. It was buried on it from the 9th to the 12th century. In addition to skeletal finds, various objects, hollow bronze gilded buttons with ornaments, silver earrings and other finds were found in the graves.

Current status 
The remains of church buildings are presented in the form of partial foundations. There is also information board with a description nearby. Remains are located a few meters from the castle, in its area, and they are freely accessible.

References

External links 

 Apsida.sk - profile of sacral buildings in the area of Bratislava Castle

Churches in Slovakia
Churches in Bratislava
Buildings and structures in Bratislava
9th-century churches